Top Billing was a South African lifestyle television programme that aired on SABC3 on Saturday evenings from 18:00–19:00 with repeats on Sundays at 12:00. It was founded by Basetsana Kumalo and Patience Stevens, who own the Tswelopele Production company. The show was the longest-running entertainment and lifestyle programme in South Africa, broadcasting since 1992.  In addition to a variety of presenters, there was a voice-over guide throughout the programme. A magazine of the same name was launched in March 2004, containing similar content to the show.

Content
The weekly show had genres of beauty, fashion, food, home decor, travel and weddings. Different local and international celebrities were interviewed each week and a designer home featured as part of the show. International celebrities such as Donald Trump's ex-wife, Ivana Trump, featured on the show, as well as Hollywood actor and Beverly Hills doctor, Dr. Rey. Local celebrities such as rugby player Bryan Habana, singer Tamara Dey and Muvhango actress Ntahbiseng Mphahlele have been given equal attention.  Popular events such as awards ceremonies and fashion runway shows were showcased. Presenters travelled to locations around the world and often partook in exclusive activities such as sky-diving, skiing, and scuba-diving. Food and wine pairings were also presented, and exclusive weddings attended.

In 2019 the broadcaster cancelled the show due to high production costs. The last episode aired on 19 October 2019.

Presenters
 Nico Panagio
 Maps Maponyane
 Jade Hubner
 Lorna Maseko
 Jeannie D
 Ayanda Thabethe
 Jonathan Boynton Lee
 Ryle de Morny
 Fezile Mkhize
 Harmony Katulondi
 Basetsana Khumalo
 Jo-Ann Strauss
 Christopher Jaftha
 Tumisho Masha
 Neil McCarthy
 Michelle Garforth
 Kelly Parkhurst
 Lyndall Jarvis
 Casey B Dolan
 Vanessa Haywood
 Roxy Burger
 Natalie Becker
 Simba Mhere (actor) (deceased)
 Sinazo Cynthia Mini
 Janez Vermeiren
 Ursula Chikane
 Aidan Bennetts
 Bonang Matheba
 Michael Mol
 Dhiveja Sundrum
Iminam Tatiya

Voice-over artists
 Alex Jay
 Kevin Savage
 Phil Wright

Public opinion

People who dislike Top Billing base their hostility on the "questionable ethics" that "dressed presenters will sit down alone to a meal prepared for them in a luxurious setting. This is in a country where people are going hungry..." Others complained that the content featured in the lifestyle programme are unaffordable to the average viewer. On the contrary, Top Billing producers affirmed that the programme was aimed at "giving South Africans hope" that they too can achieve those luxuries that they see on the programme.

Tswelopele Productions
Tswelopele Productions is a production company equally owned by Basetsana Kumalo and Patience Stevens. After the success of Top Billing, Tswelopele also produces other local productions such as Afrikaans lifestyle programme Pasella, SiSwati youth show Ses'khona, travel series Top Travel, Top Dogs and No Reservations.

Controversy

In 2009, Tswelopele staff members suffered a 10% wage cut for 7 months after Tswelopele waited for SABC to renew their contract. This was accompanied by an 8-day late salary payment, after the company had apparently spent R400,000 expanding their working premises.

In 2017, Tswelopele faced additional controversy when the broadcaster was unable to pay not only Tswelopele but several South African production companies that produced their content. This resulted in salaries being paid late. An article published by ZAlebs stated that the presenters had also not been paid.

Competition
In 2009, M-Net launched a lifestyle programme that was similar in content to that of Top Billing. The M-Net show, All Access, was given the same time slot as Top Billing. Lani Lombard, M-Net's publicist, was reported saying that the show will be "fun-filled, unpretentious and we trust that many M-net viewers who have been watching Top Billing over the years will migrate to All Access". Five seasons of the show were aired on M-Net before it was moved to one of M-Net's sister channels, Mzanzi Magic.

References

External links
 http://www.topbilling.com
 http://www.tswelopele-sa.org.za
 http://www.sabc3.co.za

1996 South African television series debuts
SABC 3 original programming
1990s travel television series
Wedding television shows
1990s South African television series
2000s travel television series
2000s South African television series
2010s travel television series
2010s South African television series